Alaa Nabiel (born 27 January 1962) is a former football footballer, He represented Egypt in the 1984 Summer Olympics.

References

External links

Alaa Nabel's Curriculum Vitae
  (player)
  (manager)

1962 births
Living people
Egyptian footballers
Al Mokawloon Al Arab SC players
Egypt international footballers
Footballers at the 1984 Summer Olympics
Al-Faisaly SC managers
Expatriate football managers in Jordan
Association football forwards
Al Mokawloon Al Arab SC managers
Egyptian football managers
Olympic footballers of Egypt